Three naval vessels of Japan have been named Amagi:

 , an early vessel of the Imperial Japanese Navy
 , a vessel in the Imperial Japanese Navy, sister ship of 

Imperial Japanese Navy ship names
Japanese Navy ship names